The area density (also known as areal density, surface density, superficial density, areic density, mass thickness, column density, or density thickness) of a two-dimensional object is calculated as the mass per unit area. The SI derived unit is the kilogram per square metre (kg·m−2). 
A related area number density can be defined by replacing mass in by number of particles or other countable quantity.

In the paper and fabric industries, it is called grammage and is expressed in grams per square meter (g/m2); for paper in particular, it may be expressed as pounds per ream of standard sizes ("basis ream").

Formulation 
Area density can be calculated as:

or

Column density 
A special type of area density is called column (mass) density (also columnar mass density), denoted ρA or σ. It is the mass of substance per unit area integrated along a path; It is obtained integrating volumetric density  over a column:

In general the integration path can be slant or oblique incidence (as in, for example, line of sight propagation in atmospheric physics). A common special case is a vertical path, from the bottom to the top of the medium:

where  denotes the vertical coordinate (e.g., height or depth).

Columnar density  is closely related to the vertically averaged volumetric density  as

Column number density 
Column number density refers instead to a number density type of quantity: the number or count of a substance—rather than the mass—per unit area integrated along a path:

Usage

Atmospheric physics
It is a quantity commonly retrieved by remote sensing instruments, for instance the Total Ozone Mapping Spectrometer (TOMS) which retrieves ozone columns around the globe.  Columns are also returned by the differential optical absorption spectroscopy (DOAS) method and are a common retrieval product from nadir-looking microwave radiometers.

A closely related concept is that of ice or liquid water path, which specifies the volume per unit area or depth instead of mass per unit area, thus the two are related:
,

Another closely related concept is optical depth.

Astronomy

In Astronomy the column density is generally used to indicate the number of atoms or molecules per square cm (cm2) along the line of sight in a particular direction, as derived from observations of e.g. the 21-cm hydrogen line or from observations of a certain molecular species. Also the interstellar extinction can be related to the column density of H or H2.

The concept of area density can be useful when analysing accretion disks. In the case of a disk seen face-on, area density for a given area of the disk is defined as column density: that is, either as the mass of substance per unit area integrated along the vertical path that goes through the disk (line-of-sight), from the bottom to the top of the medium:

where  denotes the vertical coordinate (e.g., height or depth), or as the number or count of a substance—rather than the mass—per unit area integrated along a path (column number density):

Data storage media

Areal density is used to quantify and compare different types media used in data storage devices such as hard disk drives, optical disc drives and tape drives.  The current unit of measure is typically gigabits per square inch.

Paper

The area density is often used to describe the thickness of paper; e.g., 80 g/m2 is very common.

Fabric

Fabric "weight" is often specified as mass per unit area, grams per square meter (gsm) or ounces per square yard. It is also sometimes specified in ounces per yard in a standard width for the particular cloth. One gram per square meter equals 0.0295 ounces per square yard; one ounce per square yard equals 33.9 grams per square meter.

Other

It is also an important quantity for the absorption of radiation. 

When studying bodies falling through air, area density is important because resistance depends on area, and gravitational force is dependent on mass.

Bone density is often expressed in grams per square centimeter (g·cm−2) as measured by x-ray absorptiometry, as a proxy for the actual density.

The body mass index is expressed in units of kilograms per square meter, though the area figure is nominal, being the square of the height.

The total electron content in the ionosphere is a quantity of type columnar number density.

Snow water equivalent is a quantity of type columnar mass density.

See also
 Linear density
 Paper density

References

Atmospheric physics
Density
Classical mechanics